Pimentel is a Portuguese and Spanish surname, held in part by members of the House of Pimentel, a Spanish noble family of Portuguese origin and established in the Kingdom of Castile. Pimentel denotes pepper plants and spices, suggesting an occupation (pepper farmer) or a location (where pepper grows) as the origin of the name.

Individuals with this surname

 Abraham Cohen Pimentel (died 1697), Portuguese Sephardic Dutch Rabbi
 Alejandro Sanchez Pimentel (born 1959), Dominican basketball-player
 Antonio Pimentel Tlahuitoltzin (16th century), ruler of Texcoco
 António de Serpa Pimentel (1825-1900), Portuguese Prime Minister
 Aquilino "Nene" Pimentel Jr. (1933-2019), Filipino human rights activist
 Aquilino "Koko" L. Pimentel III (born 1964), Filipino politician and lawyer
 Daniel Kenedy Pimentel Mateus dos Santos (born 1974), Portuguese footballer
 David Pimentel (1925–2019), environmental science professor 
 Diego Carrillo de Mendoza y Pimentel (died 1631), Spanish viceroy
 Eleonora Fonseca Pimentel (1752-1799), Italian poet and revolutionary)
 Eloá Pimentel, hostage victim
 Esmeralda Pimentel (born 1989), Mexican actress and model
 Fernando Álvarez de Toledo y Pimentel (1507-1582), Spanish duke
 Fernando Pimentel (born 1951), Brazilian politician and economist
 Gaspar de Guzmán y Pimentel (1587-1645), Spanish duke and prime minister
 Genaro Gongora Pimentel (born 1937), Mexican jurist
 George C. Pimentel (1922-1989), American inventor of Chemical laser
 Gerardo García Pimentel (1983-2007), Mexican journalist
 Henriëtte Pimentel (1876-1943), Dutch teacher and nurse murdered at Auschwitz
 Isaías Pimentel (1933-2017), Venezuelan tennis player
 Jessica Pimentel (born 1982), American actress and musician
 Jesús Pimentel (born 1940), Mexican boxer
 Joel Pimentel, founding member of Miami boy band CNCO
 Jose Pimentel Ejercito (born 1963), Filipino politician
 Lito Pimentel (born 1963), Filipino film and television actor
 Luisa Pimentel-Ejercito (born 1930), Filipino politician and first spouse
 María Josefa Pimentel, Duchess of Osuna, 12th Duchess of Benavente (1752-1834)
 Mickey Pimentel (born 1985), American football player
 Miguel Jontel Pimentel (born 1985), American singer
 Osvaldo Lenine Macedo Pimentel, known as Lenine, (born 1959), Brazilian singer
 Pepe Pimentel (1929–2013), Filipino television personality and game show host
 Richard Pimentel (born c. 1948), American disability rights activist
 Rodrigo P. Pimentel, American political analyst and DREAMer
 Rodrigo R. Pimentel (born 1972), Brazilian police officer
 Ronald Pimentel (born 1985), football player
 Sávio Bortolini Pimentel (born 1974), Brazilian footballer
 Stolmy Pimentel (born 1990), Dominican baseball player
 Thiago Pimentel Gosling (born 1979), Brazilian footballer
 Timothy Mark Pimentel Eigenmann (born 1981), Filipino actor known as Sid Lucero
 Valentín Pimentel (born 1991), Panamanian footballer

History
Ancestry of the surname has been linked to Petrus Martini Pimentel (b. 1252) and João Afonso Pimentel, a Portuguese knight. The name spread throughout the Portuguese Empire and the subsequent Portuguese diaspora.

The name is associated with the history of the Jews in Portugal, specifically the conversos to Catholicism during the Portuguese Inquisition. Tribunal records now maintained in the Torre do Tombo National Archive contain hundreds of examples of New Christian Pimentels accused of heresy and relapsing into Judaism. Pimentels of Sephardic origin have been traced to Spain, Portugal, Amsterdam, Sardinia (Italy), Brazil, and Latin America.

References

Spanish-language surnames
Portuguese-language surnames